Buff or BUFF may refer to:

People 
 Buff (surname), a list of people
 Buff (nickname), a list of people
 Johnny Buff, ring name of American world champion boxer John Lisky (1888–1955)
 Buff Bagwell, a ring name of American professional wrestler and actor Marcus Alexander Bagwell (born 1970)
 Buff Cobb (1927–2010), Italian-born American actress and former wife of Mike Wallace
 Buff Farrow (born 1967), American tennis player

Film festivals 
 Boston Underground Film Festival
 British Urban Film Festival
 BUFF International Film Festival, a Swedish film festival

Video gaming 
 Buff (video gaming), a change to a weapon or ability that deems it more viable for game balance
 Buff (MMORPGs), a temporary beneficial status effect

Other uses
 BUFF (Big Ugly Fat Fucker/Fella), a nickname of the Boeing B-52 Stratofortress bomber aircraft
 Buff (colour), a pale orange-brown colour
 Buff (turkey), a breed of domestic turkey
 Buff meat or buff, buffalo meat
 Buff, a character in Generation X
 Buffing, a metal finishing process
 Nail buffing, a cosmetic treatment
 A state of nudity – see In the buff.
 Buff leather, made of bull or elk hide

See also 
 Buff coat, a garment of military clothing
 Buff Island, Antarctica
 Buff Wood, a biological Site of Special Scientific Interest in Hatley, Cambridgeshire, England
 Buffs (disambiguation)
 Buffer (disambiguation)